Trofeo Edil C is an annual one-day cycling race held in Italy. It is rated 1.2 and is part of UCI Europe Tour.

Winners

References

Recurring sporting events established in 1997
Cycle races in Italy
1997 establishments in Italy